Rid of Me is the second studio album by English singer-songwriter and musician PJ Harvey. It was released by Island Records in May 1993, approximately one year after the release of her critically acclaimed debut album Dry. It marked a departure from Harvey's previous songwriting, being more raw and aggressive than its predecessor.

The songs on Rid of Me were performed by Harvey's eponymous trio, consisting of Harvey on guitar and vocals, Rob Ellis on drums and background vocals, and Steve Vaughan on bass. Most of the songs on the album were recorded by Steve Albini, and it was the last album they recorded as a trio before disbanding in late 1993. Rid of Me was met with critical acclaim, and is cited as one of the greatest albums of all time, ranking at number 153 on the 2020 version of Rolling Stones 500 Greatest Albums of All Time (up from 406 on the list's previous edition).

Background and history
Harvey's first two albums were recorded in quick succession and their histories intertwine. In October 1991, she released her debut single "Dress".  She signed with indie record label Too Pure and relocated to London with her bandmates. Almost immediately after the single's release, she began to receive serious positive attention from music critics in both the UK and United States. This led to several major record labels vying to sign her. Harvey was initially reluctant to sign to a major label fearing she might lose artistic control of her music, but eventually decided to sign with Island Records in February 1992. A month later, Too Pure released her debut album Dry, containing both "Dress" and "Sheela-Na-Gig", her second single. Island would later distribute Dry under its Indigo imprint.

The band toured extensively in the UK and US to support Dry. Harvey turned down an offer to play the Lollapalooza festival in the summer of 1992, but did play the Reading Festival that August. By this time, non-stop touring had begun to take its toll on Harvey's health. She suffered from what has been described as a nervous breakdown, brought on by a number of factors including exhaustion, poor eating habits, and the break-up of a relationship. Making matters worse, Central Saint Martins College of Art and Design, where she had been accepted for study, refused to hold her place for her any longer. She left her London apartment and retreated to her native Dorset. While recuperating in October 1992, she worked on the songs that would appear on Rid of Me.

Music and lyrics

Structurally, Harvey continued to complicate her songwriting by utilising "strangely skewed time signatures and twisty song structures", resulting in songs that "tilt toward performance art".

The album's lyrics have been widely interpreted as being feminist in nature. Harvey, however, repeatedly denied a feminist agenda in her songwriting, stating "I don’t even think of myself as being female half the time. When I’m writing songs I never write with gender in mind. I write about people’s relationships to each other. I’m fascinated with things that might be considered repulsive or embarrassing. I like feeling unsettled, unsure." Some of the lyrics were inspired by her personal experiences. The title track, for instance, was admittedly influenced by one of Harvey's relationships coming to an end. When told by an interviewer that "Rid of Me" sounded psychotic, she replied that she wrote the song "at my illest" and added "I was almost psychotic" at the time. But, she made it clear that not all of the lyrics were to be read autobiographically, saying "I would have to be 40 and very worn out to have lived through everything I write about".

The album also includes a cover of the Bob Dylan song "Highway 61 Revisited". Harvey's mother and father, both Dylan fans, suggested she record the track.

Recording
In the late fall of 1992 the trio embarked on a short US tour. When the tour concluded in December they stayed in America to record their new album at the secluded Pachyderm Recording Studios in Cannon Falls, Minnesota. Harvey chose Chicago musician and sound engineer Steve Albini to record the album. Harvey had admired Albini's distinctively raw recordings of bands like Pixies, Slint, The Breeders and The Jesus Lizard.

The recording session took place over a two-week period, but according to Harvey the bulk of the recording was done in three days. Most of the songs were played live in the studio. Harvey spoke highly of Albini's recording, stating, "He's the only person I know that can record a drum kit and it sounds like you're standing in front of a drum kit. It doesn't sound like it's gone through a recording process or it's coming out of speakers. You can feel the sound he records, and that is why I wanted to work with him, 'cause all I ever wanted is for us to be recorded and to sound like we do when we're playing together in a room".

She also gave insight into his recording methods, saying "The way that some people think of producing is to sort of help you to arrange or contributing or playing instruments, he does none of that. He just sets up his microphones in a completely different way from which I've ever seen anyone set up mics before, and that was astonishing. He'd have them on the floor, on the walls, on the windows, on the ceiling, twenty feet away from where you were sitting... He's very good at getting the right atmosphere to get the best take."

The song "Man Size Sextet" was not recorded by Albini. It was instead produced by Harvey, Rob Ellis, and Head.

Artwork
The cover of the album depicts Harvey topless and swinging her drenched hair into the air. The photo was captured by Harvey's friend and photographer Maria Mochnacz, and was taken in Mochnacz's bathroom in her flat in Bristol. Due to the small size of the room, she had to place her camera against the wall opposite Harvey and could not look through the camera's viewfinder. The photo was taken in total darkness and only illuminated by the split-second flash.

When the photo was delivered to Island Records, Mochnacz was told that the imperfections in the picture (such as the water drops on the wall and the house plant) could be removed. She protested this decision, responding, "It’s supposed to be like that – It’s part of the picture".

Release and reception

Rid of Me was released on 4 May 1993, and was met with widespread critical acclaim. Melody Maker raved that "No other British artist is so aggressively exploring the dark side of human nature, or its illogically black humour; no other British artist possesses the nerve, let alone the talent, to conjure up its soundtrack". Veteran UK broadcaster John Peel, a supporter of Harvey since the beginning of her career, added "You're initially so taken aback by what you're hearing. But you go back again and again and it implants itself on your consciousness." The San Francisco Chronicle called Harvey "A talent and a singular voice that demands to be heard." Evelyn McDonnell of Spin wrote that Harvey made it a point to "confound expectations and stereotypes". The album also drew attention from more established musicians. Elvis Costello, for example, commented that a lot of Harvey's songs "seem to be about blood and fucking", a statement Harvey disagreed with.

Steve Albini's production of the record proved controversial. Critics were divided over whether his recording complemented Harvey's voice or buried it. On the positive side, it was written that "Albini deftly balances heavy feedback and distortion with unexpected quiet breaks, making this release more musically diverse- and ultimately more satisfying- than PJ Harvey's debut." But others considered the recording too harsh, saying "Steve Albini's deliberately crude production leaves everything minimal and rough, as if the whole album were recorded in somebody's basement, with the drums set up in a bathroom to clatter as chaotically as possible." Another review called it simply "a trial to endure". Critic Stephen Thomas Erlewine tried to reconcile Albini's production with Harvey's songs. He admitted the album has a "bloodless, abrasive edge" that leaves "absolutely no subtleties in the music", but theorises that Albini's recordings "may be the aural embodiment of the tortured lyrics, and therefore a supremely effective piece of performance art, but it also makes Rid of Me a difficult record to meet halfway."

Harvey herself was pleased with the result.  "I do everything for myself primarily," she said, "and I was happy with it. I don’t really listen when people say good things about my work because I tend to not give myself praise about anything. But I was really pleased with Rid of Me. For that period of my life, it was perfect. Well, it wasn’t perfect but as near to as I could get at that time". She remained friends with Albini afterward, finding in him a kindred spirit. "People read things in and make him what they want him to be," Harvey said. "He's the only other person I know that that happens to besides myself. People have a very specific idea of what I am- some kind of ax-wielding, man-eating Vampira- and I'm not that at all. I'm almost the complete opposite."

The album yielded two singles; "50 ft. Queenie" and "Man-Size". The music videos for both songs were directed by Maria Mochnacz. "50 ft. Queenie" was named a buzzworthy video by MTV in the Spring of 1993.

Tour
Harvey and her band toured in the spring and summer of 1993 to support Rid of Me. The tour began in the UK in May and moved to America in June. Maria Mochnacz documented aspects of the tour, and her footage was used to create the long-form video Reeling with PJ Harvey (1994). Harvey's concert setlist drew from Dry and Rid of Me, but also highlighted songs that did not appear on either of those recordings. For example, she regularly performed a cover of the Willie Dixon song "Wang Dang Doodle". One reviewer praised Harvey's version and called it "perhaps the definitive version of that song."

In August they finished the tour with a string of dates opening for U2 during their Zooropa tour. In the fall the trio started to disintegrate, first with the departure of Ellis and then Vaughan shortly afterward. By September Harvey was performing as a solo artist.

Accolades
Rid of Me entered the UK Albums Chart at number three and quickly went silver, and enjoyed a top-30 hit in the single "50 ft. Queenie". In the US it generated major college-radio airplay and expanded her growing fan base. It also won considerable critical acclaim and featured in various top ten album-of-the-year lists in respectable press, like The Village Voice, Spin, Melody Maker, Vox and Select. Spin gave it a rare ten out of ten review rating. Rid of Me was shortlisted for the 1993 Mercury Prize, but lost to Suede. If anything its critical stature has grown over the years—Rolling Stone selected it as one of the Essential Recordings of the 90s, and in 2005, Spin ranked it the ninth greatest album of 1985–2005 after it had ranked it only the 37th greatest album of the 90s after To Bring You My Love at number 3. In 2003, the album was ranked number 405 on Rolling Stone magazine's list of the 500 greatest albums of all time; the list's 2012 edition had it ranked 406th. In 2011, Slant Magazine ranked Rid of Me as the 25th greatest album of the 90s. In 2014, the album placed tenth on the Alternative Nation site's "Top 10 Underrated 90’s Alternative Rock Albums" list. The title track was ranked #194 on the 2021 version of Rolling Stone's 500 Greatest Songs of All Time.

Track listing

Personnel
All personnel credits adapted from Rid of Mes liner notes.

PJ Harvey Trio
PJ Harvey – vocals, guitar, organ, cello, violin, producer (6)
Steve Vaughan – bass
Rob Ellis – drums, percussion, backing vocals, arrangement, producer (6)

Technical
Steve Albini – producer, engineering, mixing
Head – producer, engineer (6)
John Loder – mastering

Design
Maria Mochnacz – photography

Charts

Singles

Certifications

References

1993 albums
PJ Harvey albums
Albums produced by Steve Albini
Island Records albums